Nixtamalization is a process for the preparation of corn, or other grain, in which the grain is soaked and cooked in an alkaline solution, usually limewater (but sometimes aqueous alkali metal carbonates), washed, and then hulled. The term can also refer to the removal via an alkali process of the pericarp from other grains such as sorghum.

Nixtamalized corn has several benefits over unprocessed grain: It is more easily ground, its nutritional value is increased, flavor and aroma are improved, and mycotoxins are reduced by up to 97%–100% (for aflatoxins). 

Lime and ash are highly alkaline: the alkalinity helps the dissolution of hemicellulose, the major glue-like component of the maize cell walls, and loosens the hulls from the kernels and softens the maize. Corn's hemicellulose-bound niacin is converted to free niacin (a form of vitamin B3), making it available for absorption into the body, thus helping to prevent pellagra.

Some of the corn oil is broken down into emulsifying agents (monoglycerides and diglycerides), while bonding of the maize proteins to each other is also facilitated. The divalent calcium in lime acts as a cross-linking agent for protein and polysaccharide acidic side chains.

As a result, while cornmeal made from untreated ground maize is unable by itself to form a dough on addition of water, the chemical changes in masa allow dough formation. These benefits make nixtamalization a crucial preliminary step for further processing of maize into food products, and the process is employed using both traditional and industrial methods, in the production of tortillas and tortilla chips (but not corn chips), tamales, hominy, and many other items.

Etymology
The Nahuatl word is a compound of  "lime ashes" and  "unformed/cooked corn dough, tamal". The term nixtamalization can also be used to describe the removal of the pericarp from any grain by an alkali process, including maize, sorghum, and others. When the unaltered Spanish spelling  is used in written English, however, it almost exclusively refers to maize.

The labels on packages of commercially sold tortillas prepared with nixtamalized maize usually list corn treated with lime as an ingredient in English, while the Spanish versions list .

History

Mesoamerica

The process of nixtamalization was first developed in Mesoamerica, where maize was originally cultivated. There is no precise date when the technology was developed, but the earliest evidence of nixtamalization is found in Guatemala's southern coast, with equipment dating from 1200–1500 BC.

How nixtamalization was discovered is not known, but one possibility may have been through the use of hot stones (see Pot boiler) to boil corn in early cultures which did not have cooking vessels robust enough to put directly on fire or coals. In limestone regions like those in Guatemala and southern Mexico, heated chunks of limestone would naturally be used, and experiments show that hot limestone makes the cooking water sufficiently alkaline to cause nixtamalization. Archaeological evidence supporting this possibility has been found in southern Utah, United States.

The Aztec and Mayan civilizations developed nixtamalization using slaked lime (calcium hydroxide) and lye (potassium hydroxide) to create alkaline solutions. The Chibcha people to the north of the ancient Inca also used calcium hydroxide (also known as "cal"), while the tribes of North America used soda ash.

The nixtamalization process was very important in the early Mesoamerican diet, as most of the niacin content in unprocessed maize is bound to hemicellulose, drastically reducing its bioavailability. A population that depends on untreated maize as a staple food risks malnourishment and is more likely to develop deficiency diseases such as pellagra, niacin deficiency, or kwashiorkor, the absence of certain amino acids that maize is deficient in. Maize cooked with lime or other alkali provided bioavailable niacin to Mesoamericans. Beans provided the otherwise missing amino acids required to balance maize for complete protein.

The spread of maize cultivation in the Americas was accompanied by the adoption of the nixtamalization process. Traditional and contemporary regional cuisines (including Maya cuisine, Aztec cuisine, and Mexican cuisine) included, and still include, foods based on nixtamalized maize.

The process has not substantially declined in usage in the Mesoamerican region, though there has been a decline in North America. Many North American Native American tribes, such as the Huron, no longer use the process. In some Mesoamerican and North American regions, dishes are still made from nixtamalized maize prepared by traditional techniques. The Hopi produce sodium carbonate from ashes of various native plants and trees. Some contemporary Maya use calcium salts in the form of ashes of burnt mussel shells or heated limestone.

In the United States, European settlers did not always adopt the nixtamalization process, except in the case of hominy grits, though maize became a staple among the poor of the southern states. This led to endemic pellagra in poor populations throughout the southern US in the early 20th century. A more varied diet and fortification of wheat flour, the other staple food, have essentially eliminated this deficiency.

Process

Cooking 

In the first step of nixtamalization, kernels of dried maize are cooked in an alkaline solution at or near the mixture's boiling point. After cooking, the maize is steeped in the cooking liquid for a period. The length of time for which the maize is boiled and soaked varies according to local traditions and the type of food being prepared, with cooking times ranging from a few minutes to an hour, and soaking times from a few minutes to about a day.

During cooking and soaking, a number of chemical changes take place in the grains of maize. Because plant cell wall components, including hemicellulose and pectin, are highly soluble in alkaline solutions, the kernels soften and their pericarps (hulls) loosen. The grain hydrates and absorbs calcium or potassium (depending on the alkali used) from the cooking solution. Starches swell and gelatinize, and some starches disperse into the liquid. Certain chemicals from the germ are released that allow the cooked grains to be ground more easily, yet make dough made from the grains less likely to tear and break down. Cooking changes the grain's protein matrix, which makes proteins and nutrients from the endosperm of the kernel more available to the human body.

Extraction 
After cooking, the alkaline liquid (known as nejayote), containing dissolved hull, starch, and other corn matter, is decanted and discarded (or sometimes used for making amate bark paper). The kernels are washed thoroughly of remaining nejayote, which has an unpleasant flavor. The pericarp is then removed, leaving the endosperm of the grain with or without the germ, depending on the process. This hulling is performed by hand, in traditional or very small-scale preparation, or mechanically, in larger scale or industrial production.

The prepared grain is called hominy or nixtamal. Nixtamal has many uses, contemporary and historic. Whole nixtamal may be used fresh or dried for later use. Whole nixtamal is used in the preparation of pozole, menudo, and other foods. Ground fresh nixtamal is made into masa (nixtamal dough) and used to make tortillas, tamales, and arepas. Dried and ground, it is called masa harina or instant masa flour, and is reconstituted and used like masa.

The term hominy may refer to whole, coarsely ground, or finely ground nixtamal, or to a cooked porridge (also called samp) prepared from any of these.

Enzymatic nixtamalization
An alternative process for use in industrial settings has been developed known as enzymatic nixtamalization, which uses protease enzymes to accelerate the changes that occur in traditional nixtamalization, a technique borrowed from modern corn wet-milling. A secondary enzymatic digestion may follow to further dissolve the pericarp. The resulting nixtamal is ground with little or no washing or hulling.

By pre-soaking the maize, minimizing the alkali used to adjust the pH of the alkaline solution, reducing the cooking temperature, accelerating processing, and reusing excess processing liquids, enzymatic nixtamalization can reduce the use of energy and water, lower nejayote (alkaline wastewater) production, decrease maize lost in processing, and shorten the production time (to approximately four hours) compared to traditional nixtamalization.

Effects of enzymatic nixtamalization on flavor, aroma, nutritional value, and cost, compared to traditional methods, are not well documented.

Impact on health
The primary nutritional benefits of nixtamalization arise from the alkaline processing involved. These conditions convert corn's hemicellulose-bound niacin ("niacytin") to free niacin, making it available for absorption into the body, thus helping to prevent pellagra. 

Secondary benefits can arise from the grain's absorption of minerals from the alkali used or from the vessels used in preparation. These effects can increase calcium (by 750%, with 85% available for absorption), iron, copper, and zinc.

Lastly, nixtamalization significantly deactivates (by 90–94%) mycotoxins produced by Fusarium verticillioides and Fusarium proliferatum, molds that commonly infect maize, the toxins of which are putative carcinogens.

References

Coe, Sophie. America's First Cuisines (1994). 
Davidson, Alan. Oxford Companion to Food (1999), “Nixtamalization”, p. 534. 
Kulp, Karen and Klaude J. Lorenz (editors). Handbook of Cereal Science and Technology (2000), p. 670. 
McGee, Harold. On Food and Cooking, 2nd Edition (2004) p. 477-478 
Food and Agricultural Organization, United Nations. Maize in Human Nutrition
Smith, C. Wayne, Javier Betrán and E. C. A. Runge (editors). Corn: Origins, History and Technology (2004) p. 275 

Cooking techniques
Mexican cuisine
Mesoamerican cuisine
Maize
Food science

de:Mais#Nixtamalisation